Rosaria Champagne Butterfield (born 1962) is a writer, speaker, homemaker, and former tenured professor of English at Syracuse University.

Career 
Butterfield, who earned her Ph.D. from Ohio State University in English Literature, served in the English Department and Women Studies Program at Syracuse University from 1992 to 2002. During her academic career, she published the book The Politics of Survivorship: Incest, Women's Literature, and Feminist Theory as well as many scholarly articles. Her academic interest was focused on feminist theory, queer theory and 19th century British literature. She was awarded tenure in 1999, the same year that she converted to Christianity. She married in 2001.

Autobiography 
Growing up, Butterfield attended predominantly liberal Catholic schools. She is most widely known today for her autobiography The Secret Thoughts of an Unlikely Convert: An English Professor's Journey into the Christian Faith, in which she details her transformation from a postmodernist into a Bible-believing Christian. For nearly a decade, she lived as an openly lesbian activist. While researching the Religious Right and their "politics of hatred" against the queer community, she wrote an article criticizing the evangelical organization Promise Keepers. Ken Smith, the then-pastor of the Syracuse Reformed Presbyterian Church, wrote to her regarding this article and invited her to dinner. Her subsequent friendship with the Smiths led to her re-evaluation of her presuppositions. Two years later, Butterfield came to faith. Following her conversion, she developed a ministry to college students. She now frequently speaks at churches and universities about her experience. She has taught and ministered at Geneva College. She now lives in Durham, North Carolina with her husband, Kent Butterfield, a pastor, and their children.

Philosophy 
In her books, she describes how she decided to be a lesbian from ages 28 to 36. She does not identify herself as "ex-gay" and does not think same-sex-attracted Christians should identify as gay Christians. She believes that "[t]he job of the adjective is to change the noun." Butterfield has criticized conversion therapy for contending that the "primary goal of Christianity is to resolve homosexuality through heterosexuality, thus failing to see that repentance and victory over sin are God's gifts and failing to remember that sons and daughters of the King can be full members of Christ's body and still struggle with sexual temptation." Butterfield suggested that conversion therapy's fixation on "healing" homosexuals is a version of the prosperity gospel. (She has since qualified this statement by clarifying that her critique applied to the type of counseling that prioritizes sanctification over justification.) She has written several best-selling books against what she perceives as prosperity gospel.

Publications

 Crimes of Reading: Incest and Censorship in Mary Shelley's Early Novels (Thesis, 1992)
 The Politics of Survivorship: Incest, Women's Literature, and Feminist Theory (1996)
 The Secret Thoughts of an Unlikely Convert: An English Professor's Journey into the Christian Faith (2012)
 Openness Unhindered: Further Thoughts of an Unlikely Convert on Sexual Identity and Union with Christ (2015)
 The Gospel Comes with a House Key: Practicing Radically Ordinary Hospitality in Our Post-Christian World (2018)

References

1962 births
Living people
American religious writers
American Presbyterians
Women religious writers
Ohio State University Graduate School alumni
Syracuse University faculty
Geneva College faculty
Converts to Presbyterianism
Converts to Protestantism from atheism or agnosticism
20th-century Presbyterians
21st-century Presbyterians
American women non-fiction writers
American women academics
21st-century American women